"Solo" is a song by Mexican-American cumbia group A. B. Quintanilla y Los Kumbia All Starz. It was released on October 30, 2012 as the first single from Quintanilla's eighth studio album Blanco y Negro (2013).

Music video
The music video was directed by A. B. Quintanilla's sister Suzette Quintanilla and was shot at Corpus Christi, Texas. It was released on November 19, 2012. The video shows A. B. Quintanilla and the Kumbia All Starz and Quintanilla's wife Rikkie Leigh Robertson as a DJ performing at a club.

Track listing
 Digital download
 "Solo" – 3:42

Personnel
 Written by A. B. Quintanilla and Luigi Giraldo
 Produced by A. B. Quintanilla and Luigi Giraldo
 Lead vocals by Angel Castillo
 Background vocals by A. B. Quintanilla

External links
 "Solo" (Music Video) at YouTube

References

2012 songs
2012 singles
Kumbia All Starz songs
Songs written by A. B. Quintanilla
Song recordings produced by A. B. Quintanilla
Spanish-language songs
EMI Latin singles